Landmark Forest Adventure Park is a nature-based theme and adventure park in the village of Carrbridge, Highlands, Scotland.

Attractions

References

External links

Landmark on TripAdvisor

Tourist attractions in Highland (council area)
Amusement parks in Scotland
Amusement parks opened in 1970
Buildings and structures in Highland (council area)
Adventure parks